In journalism, a stringer is a freelance journalist, photographer, or videographer who contributes reports, photos, or videos to a news organization on an ongoing basis but is paid individually for each piece of published or broadcast work.

As freelancers, stringers do not receive a regular salary and the amount and type of work is typically at their discretion. However, stringers often have an ongoing relationship with one or more news organizations, to which they provide content on particular topics or locations when the opportunities arise.

The term is typically confined to news industry jargon. In print or in broadcast terms, stringers are sometimes referred to as correspondents or contributors; at other times, they may not receive any public recognition for the work they have contributed.

A reporter or photographer can "string" for a news organization in a number of different capacities and with varying degrees of regularity, so that the relationship between the organization and the stringer is typically very loose.  When it is difficult for a staff reporter or photographer to reach a location quickly for breaking news stories, larger news organizations often rely on local stringers to provide rapid scene descriptions, quotations or photos. In this capacity, stringers are used heavily by most television news organizations and some print publications for video footage, photos, and interviews.

Etymology and usage
In a journalistic context, the etymology of the word is uncertain. It is said that newspapers once paid such freelancer journalists per inch of printed text they generated, and that they used string to measure and bill their work. The theory given in the Oxford English Dictionary is that a stringer is a person who strings words together.

Portrayal in popular media
Peter Parker (Spider-Man) is depicted in comics, movies, and various other media as a stringer who captures and sells the pictures to local news, most notably the Daily Bugle.
Joe Pesci plays Leon Bernstein, a stringer for tabloids in New York, in the 1992 film The Public Eye.
Conner Foster plays Eric Hayes, a stringer who discovers gruesome atrocities, in the 2003 film The Ghouls.
Lou Bloom, played by Jake Gyllenhaal in the 2014 film Nightcrawler, is a stringer.
 The 2017 Netflix series, Shot in the Dark, follows a group of stringers in Los Angeles, California.
 The 2021 YouTube documentary, Code Two Zero, follows stringers in Los Angeles.
The 2021 BBC documentary Whirlybird: Live Above LA.
Clark Kent (Superman) at the end of Man of Steel (2013) Clark Kent Henry Cavill is introduced to the staff of the Daily Planet by editor Perry White, "This is Clark Kent, our new stringer, show him the ropes."

See also

Contributor network
Parachute journalism
Shot in the Dark

References

External links
OnScene TV
Loudlabs News
Incident Response
RMG News
Key News Network

Journalism terminology